The 12919 / 12920 Malwa Express is a Superfast Express train service of the Indian Railways connecting  of Madhya Pradesh and  of Jammu and Kashmir. It is currently being operated with 12919/12920 train numbers on a daily basis.

The name Malwa signifies the region of Madhya Pradesh where the city of Indore is located.

History 

It was the first Indian train to reach Pakistan as a diplomatic gesture.
In mid 1982 contemporaneous Member of Parliament from Indore Prakash Chandra Sethi became Railway Minister for a short time, Sectioned Indore New Delhi Express which is named Malwa Express.

On 22 October 1985, it terminated at Lahore in Pakistan running as Indore–Lahore Special, but the service was withdrawn after 55 days due to controversies.

It is the 5th train in India and Madhya Pradesh to get an ISO certificate, after the Bhopal Express, Rewanchal Express and Ahilyanagari Express.

In January 2019, Malwa Express was extended up to Dr. Ambedkar Nagar (Mhow) from Indore Junction.

In March 2020 it gets LHB coach.

Coach composition

The train consists of 22 coaches:           * 1 First AC
 2 AC II Tier
 6 AC III Tier
 8 Sleeper class
 1 Pantry car
 2 General Unreserved
 2 EOG

Service

The 12919/Malwa Superfast Express has an average speed of 55 km/hr and covers 1641 km in 29 hrs 20 mins.
The 12920/Malwa Superfast Express has an average speed of 55 km/hr and covers 1641 km in 30 hrs 20 mins.

Route & Halts 

The important halts of the train are:

Schedule

Reversals

The train is reversed 2 times at:

Traction

Both trains are hauled by a Vadodara based WAP-5 locomotive between Dr. Ambedkar Nagar and Bhopal Junction. After Bhopal Junction, both trains are hauled by a Itarsi based WAP-7 locomotive up to Shri Mata Vaishno Devi Katra and vice versa.

See also 

 Indore–Jammu Tawi Weekly Superfast Express
 Indore–Chandigarh Weekly Express
 Indore–Dehradun Express
 Indore–Amritsar Express
 Indore–New Delhi Intercity Express

References

External links 

Train status

Express trains in India
Rail transport in Madhya Pradesh
Railway services introduced in 1969
Transport in Mhow
Transport in Katra, Jammu and Kashmir
Rail transport in Uttar Pradesh
Rail transport in Haryana
Rail transport in Rajasthan
Rail transport in Delhi
Rail transport in Punjab, India
Rail transport in Jammu and Kashmir
Named passenger trains of India